Daniel Clasen, in Latin Danielis Clasenius or Clasenus (1 May 1622, Lüneburg – 20 November 1678, Helmstedt), was a German political theorist, religious scholar, and classicist.

His treatises, written in Latin, dealt with law, jurisprudence, religion, and politics. Clasen was one of the earliest theorists of political religion, though preceded by Tommaso Campanella (1568–1639), and argued against accommodation theory.

Clasen was a major mythographer of the 17th century, and wrote commentaries on classical texts such as the so-called Tablet of Cebes (Cebetis Tabula vitae humanae), for which he provided a Latin translation.

Works
Clasen's works include:
 Commentarius in constitutiones criminales Caroli V. Imperatoris
 De religione politica
 De iure legitimationis exercitatio iuridica
 Exercitatio iuridica de patria potestate
 Politicae compendium succinctum cum notis
 De iure aggratiandi
 Theologia gentilis (vol. 7 of the series Thesaurus Graecarum antiquitatum edited by Jakob Gronovius)
 De oraculis gentilium et in specie de vaticiniis Sibyllinis

References

17th-century German people
German classical scholars
Religious studies scholars
Religion and politics
Mythographers
1678 deaths
1622 births